Granite Mountain is a tall peak in the Cascade Range in King County, Washington  east of North Bend. A fire lookout on the summit can be reached by trail. 
The fire lookout was first constructed in 1924 and was then rebuilt 31 years later. It is still maintained by volunteers June through September each year.

Climate
Granite Mountain is located in the marine west coast climate zone of western North America. Most weather fronts originate in the Pacific Ocean, and travel northeast toward the Cascade Mountains. As fronts approach, they are forced upward by the peaks of the Cascade Range, causing them to drop their moisture in the form of rain or snowfall onto the Cascades. As a result, the west side of the North Cascades experiences high precipitation, especially during the winter months in the form of snowfall. Due to its temperate climate and proximity to the Pacific Ocean, areas west of the Cascade Crest very rarely experience temperatures below  or above . During winter months, weather is usually cloudy, but, due to high pressure systems over the Pacific Ocean that intensify during summer months, there is often little or no cloud cover during the summer. Because of maritime influence, snow tends to be wet and heavy, resulting in high avalanche danger.

See also 
 Granite Mountain (North Cascades) Okanogan county
 Granite Mountain (South Cascades) Chelan and Kittitas counties

References

External links 

 

Mountains of King County, Washington
Mountains of Washington (state)